San Vicente Academy (SVA) is an educational institution in Cotabato City, Mindanao, Philippines. It was founded in 1990.

Schools in Cotabato City
Educational institutions established in 1990
1990 establishments in the Philippines